In enzymology, a fluorothreonine transaldolase is an enzyme that catalyzes the chemical reaction

L-threonine + fluoroacetaldehyde  acetaldehyde + 4-fluoro-L-threonine

Thus, the two substrates of this enzyme are L-threonine and fluoroacetaldehyde, whereas its two products are acetaldehyde and 4-fluoro-L-threonine.

This enzyme belongs to the family of transferases, specifically those transferring aldehyde or ketonic groups (transaldolases and transketolases, respectively).  The systematic name of this enzyme class is fluoroacetaldehyde:L-threonine aldehydetransferase.

References

 
 

EC 2.2.1
Enzymes of unknown structure